Ramboda is a village in Sri Lanka. It is located within Central Province. 

The Ramboda Road Tunnel is currently the longest road tunnel in Sri Lanka and is situated on the A5 highway (Perandenyia - Nuwara Eliya Road), close to Ramboda falls. Construction of the tunnel began in 2006, and it opened in February 2008. The tunnel cost Rs. 2,000M and was substantially funded by the Japanese Government. The 1,000 rupee banknote, issued 4 February 2011, features an artist's impression of the Ramboda tunnel, with the rock wall at the same location before construction.

The  Wavenden Estate in Ramboda was the birthplace of the British Admiral of the Fleet, Lord Fisher.

See also
List of towns in Central Province, Sri Lanka

References

External links

Populated places in Nuwara Eliya District
Road tunnels in Sri Lanka